Bishop's College, Calcutta is an Anglican educational establishment founded  on 15th December 1820 at Sibpur by Thomas Fanshawe Middleton the first bishop of the Anglican diocese of Calcutta. The College was started in Shibpur, on the west bank of the Hooghly river, a location now occupied by the Bengal Engineering and Science University (IIEST Shibpur).

Principals

1849–1864 William Kay.

References

Educational institutions established in 1820
Anglican seminaries and theological colleges
Education in Kolkata
Seminaries and theological colleges affiliated to the Senate of Serampore College (University)
1820 establishments in British India
Christian universities and colleges in India
Seminaries and theological colleges in India
India